Pelochyta draudti is a moth of the family Erebidae. It was described by Adalbert Seitz in 1922. It is found in Mexico and French Guiana.

References

Pelochyta
Moths described in 1922